Viktor Vladimirovich Uan (born 19 August 1994) is a Russian football player.

Club career
He made his debut in the Russian Second Division for FC Irtysh Omsk on 25 April 2013 in a game against FC Yakutiya Yakutsk.

He made his Russian Football National League debut for FC Fakel Voronezh on 12 March 2016 in a game against FC Tyumen.

References

External links
 Career summary by sportbox.ru
 

1994 births
People from Omsk Oblast
Living people
Russian footballers
Association football midfielders
Association football defenders
FC Irtysh Omsk players
FC Fakel Voronezh players
FC Neftekhimik Nizhnekamsk players
FC Zenit-Izhevsk players
FC Nosta Novotroitsk players
FC Chita players